Pentila landbecki is a butterfly in the family Lycaenidae. It is found in the Democratic Republic of the Congo (Sankuru and Lulua).

References

Butterflies described in 1961
Poritiinae
Endemic fauna of the Democratic Republic of the Congo
Butterflies of Africa